Etajima base (JMSDF Etajima Naval Base) in Etajima city, Hiroshima prefecture is in the Etajima-cho government building and is the base of the Japan Maritime Self-Defense Force. Beside housing the 1st Technical School and the Officer Candidates School, it is home to the local Kure Naval District, LCAC training facilities, and Self-Defense Force oil storage. In addition, the Special Forces of the Maritime Self Defense Force is here.

History
The predecessor of the Etajima base was the branch officer training system of the Imperial Japanese Naval Academy. The Naval Academy moved to Etajima from Tsukiji, Tokyo in 1888. The current academy was re-established in 1956.

Before World War II, the Britannia Royal Naval College and United States Naval Academy were called the “worldwide 3 large service academies”. Many of the facilities of the Naval Academy are used by the 1st Technical School and the Officer Candidate School.

Agency unit arrangement 
 The Maritime Self Defense Force 1st Technical School
 The Maritime Self Defense Force Officer Candidate School
 The 31st Fleet Air Wing
 The target plane service area
 The Special guard (Maritime Self Defense Force)
 The Etajima police duty casual detachment
 The Kure structure learning/repairing depot
 The Hitonose oil storage branch
 The Kure ammunition storehouse and maintenance depot
 The 1st Technical School sick bay

The Naval History Museum 
 
The Naval History Museum is a building of reinforced concrete that was constructed in 1936. It holds artifacts of Heihachiro Togo, Horatio Nelson, John Paul Jones and Isoroku Yamamoto, as well as a book of naval officers which holds more than 10,000 names. Inside the site is a midget submarine that was used in the Pearl Harbor attack; artifacts from the Japanese battleship Yamato and the Japanese battleship Mutsu are on  display.

See also

Bombing of Kure (July 1945)
Imperial Japanese Army
Imperial Japanese Navy
Imperial Japanese Navy Air Service
Kure Naval Arsenal
Military history of Japan
Japan Coast Guard Academy
National Defense Academy of Japan

External links 
 Maritime Self Defense Force 1st Technical School
 Construction map
 Present Kure troop port and Kure city

 
Japan Maritime Self-Defense Force
Naval academies
Military academies of Japan
Universities and colleges in Hiroshima Prefecture
Etajima, Hiroshima